Libuše Moníková (30 August 1945 in Prague – 12 January 1998 in Berlin) was a Czech writer, publishing in the German language. In 1968, following the Warsaw Pact invasion of Czechoslovakia, she left to Western Germany.

Awards
 1987: Alfred Döblin Prize for Die Fassade.
 1989: Franz Kafka Prize (Klosterneuberg)
 1991, Adelbert von Chamisso Prize.
 1993: Vilenica Literature Prize
 1994: Mainzer Stadtschreiber
 1995: Roswitha Prize
 1997: Medal of Merit (Czech Republic)
 1997: Cross of Merit (Germany)

Works

Novels 

 Eine Schädigung. Rotbuch, Berlin 1981, ; Hanser, München 2003, .
 Pavane für eine verstorbene Infantin. Rotbuch, Berlin 1983, dtv, München 1988, .
 Die Fassade. Hanser, München 1987 
 Schloß, Aleph, Wunschtorte. Hanser, München 1990, .
 Treibeis. Hanser, München 1992,  (s. Ludwig Wittgenstein: Literarische Rezeption).
 Prager Fenster. Hanser, München 1994, .
 Verklärte Nacht. Hanser, München Wien 1996, .
 Der Taumel. Fragment. Mit einem Nachwort von Michael Krüger. Hanser, München Wien, 2000. - Teilw. Vorabdruck: Jakub Brandl. in: Akzente 1997, H. 6., S. 512–536.

Plays 

 Tetom und Tuba. Frankfurt am Main 1987.
 Unter Menschenfressern. Dramatisches Menue in vier Gängen. Verlag der Autoren, Frankfurt am Main 1990,

References 

1945 births
1998 deaths
Czech novelists
Czech women writers
Recipients of Medal of Merit (Czech Republic)
Recipients of the Cross of the Order of Merit of the Federal Republic of Germany
Recipients of the Order of the White Lion
German women novelists
20th-century German women writers
20th-century German novelists
Writers from Prague